Herbstia is a genus of crabs, containing the following eleven species:
Herbstia camptacantha (Stimpson, 1871)
Herbstia condyliata (Fabricius, 1787)
Herbstia crassipes (H. Milne-Edwards, 1873)
Herbstia depressa Stimpson, 1860
Herbstia edwardsii Bell, 1835
Herbstia nitida Manning & Holthuis, 1981
Herbstia parvifrons Randall, 1840
Herbstia pubescens Stimpson, 1871
Herbstia pyriformis (Bell, 1835)
Herbstia rubra A. Milne-Edwards, 1869
Herbstia tumida (Stimpson, 1871)

References

Majoidea
Taxa named by Henri Milne-Edwards